Antoni Dalmau i Ribalta (13 March 1951 – 5 January 2022) was a Catalan politician. A member of the Socialists' Party of Catalonia, he served in the Parliament of Catalonia from 1988 to 1999 and was President of the Provincial Deputation of Barcelona from 1982 to 1987. He died on 5 January 2022, at the age of 70.

References

1951 births
2022 deaths
Socialists' Party of Catalonia politicians
Members of the Parliament of Catalonia
Barcelona municipal councillors
People from Igualada

Teachers of Catalan